WOPC (101.3 FM) is a radio station licensed to serve Linden, Tennessee, United States. The station is owned by Will Nunley, through licensee Nunley Media Group, LLC.

References

External links
 
 WOPC-FM Facebook

OPC
Country radio stations in the United States
Perry County, Tennessee
Radio stations established in 2014
2014 establishments in Tennessee